Gherman is the Romanian-language variant of the Slavic German; as such, it is used an alternative name for the Caloian ritual, corresponding to the South Slavic god. It may also refer to:

Places

 Gherman, a village in Bicaz-Chei Commune, Neamț County, Romania
 Gherman, a village in Jamu Mare Commune, Timiș County, Romania
 Gherman, a village in Sculeni Commune, Ungheni district, Moldova

People

Given name
Gherman Pântea (1894–1968), a Romanian politician
Gherman Titov (1935–2000), a Soviet cosmonaut

Surname
Cosmin Gherman (born 1984), a Romanian futsal player
Diomid Gherman (1928–2014), a Moldovan physician
Marius Gherman (born 1967), a Romanian artistic gymnast
Oliviu Gherman (1930–2020), a Romanian physicist, politician and diplomat
Simona Gherman (born 1985), a Romanian épée fencer

Romanian-language surnames